The 2012–13 Miami Hurricanes men's basketball team represented the University of Miami during the 2012–13 NCAA Division I men's basketball season. The Hurricanes, led by second-year head coach Jim Larrañaga, played their home games at the Bank United Center and were members of the Atlantic Coast Conference. With a veteran roster, the Hurricanes finished the regular season with a conference record of 15–3 and won the ACC regular season championship. This marked the program's first-ever outright regular season conference championship. They entered the ACC tournament as the top-seed and received a first-round bye. After defeating Boston College and NC State, they beat North Carolina to capture the 2013 ACC tournament championship and became the first ACC school other than Duke or North Carolina to win both the ACC regular season and tournament championships in the same season since the 1974 NC State team. The Hurricanes were selected as a 2-seed in the South Region of the 2013 NCAA tournament and beat 15-seed Pacific in the second round. The Hurricanes beat 7-seed Illinois in the third round to advance to the sweet sixteen where they lost to Marquette. They finished the season 29–7.

Previous season
The Hurricanes finished the 2011–12 season 20–13 overall, 9–7 in ACC play and lost in the second round of the NIT to Minnesota.

Departures

2012 recruiting class

Roster

Schedule and results

|-
!colspan=12 style=| Exhibition

|-
!colspan=12 style=| Non-conference Regular Season

|-
!colspan=12 style="background:#005030; color:white;"| ACC Regular Season

|-
!colspan=12 style=| ACC Tournament

|-
!colspan=12 style=| NCAA tournament

Rankings

References

Miami Hurricanes men's basketball seasons
Miami Hurricanes
Miami Hurricanes men's basketball team
Miami Hurricanes men's basketball team
Miami Hurricanes